Three ships of the Royal Navy have borne the name HMS Trinidad, after the Caribbean island and former British possession Trinidad:

  was a 10 gun schooner, listed in service between 1805 and 1809.
  was an  launched in 1918 and sold in 1932.
  was a  launched in 1941.  She was struck by her own torpedo whilst on convoy escort duties in 1942, and sunk later that year in a German air attack.

Royal Navy ship names